Hüseyn Kürdoğlu previously known as Hüseyn Hasanoğlu Alishanov (June 15, 1934 - July 12, 2003) was a Kurdish-Azerbaijani poet, literary critic, member of Azerbaijan Writers' Union since 1973.

Life 
Huseyn Kurdoglu was born on June 15, 1934 in the village of Ahmadli (Mollamahmadi) of the Lachin region of Azerbaijan. He was Kurdish.

He received his secondary education at many different schools, including Ahmedli village secondary school, Agdam city secondary school No. 1, Lachin city secondary school and Khanliq village school of Gubadli district. He entered the Faculty of Philology of ASU (1953-1958). He started his career as an editor of the literary drama department at the Azerbaijan Television and Radio Broadcasting Committee. Then he worked as a junior researcher at the Azerbaijan Institute of Oriental Studies (1960). Until the end of his life, he worked at the Institute of Literature named after EA Nizami of Azerbaijan (since 1993). He started his literary creativity early and published his first poems in the "Soviet Kurdistan" newspaper published in Lachin district when he was in his final year of high school. His first couplet "Gözeldir" was published in 1950 in the newspaper "Azerbaijani Yvangari" and began to appear regularly in periodicals. He was also engaged in literary translation. He was one of the founders of the "Ronahi Kurdish Cultural Center" in 1990 and the newspaper "Denge Kurd" ("Voice of the Kurds") in 1992, officially operating in Azerbaijan. He died on July 12, 2003 in Baku and was buried in Khirdalan cemetery.

Works 

 Morning songs, 1963
 A walk around my country, 1968
 Rock flowers, 1970
 My hometown, 1973
 Flower smile, 1975
 I went to my father's house, 1978 
 Four-string crane, 1979
 Wedding caravan, 1981
 Crane's voice, 1985
 The lambs went up the mountain, 1985
 The Kurdish poet Abdullah Gora, 1969 
 This world is a caravan road, 1989
 My wounded land, my wounded love, 1997. 
 I came to faith, 1999. 
 Our intelligence is our intelligence, 1999. 
 My word is a sacrifice to my country, 2005. 
 Ayta's songs, 2009

References 

1934 births
2003 deaths
Kurdish-language poets
Kurdish poets
20th-century poets
Azerbaijani poets